Glenn Seton (born 5 May 1965) is an Australian racing driver. He won the Australian Touring Car Championship in 1993 and 1997 while driving for his own team. Although he never won the Bathurst 1000 like his father Barry did in 1965, Glenn started from pole position in 1994 and 1996, and finished second three times. He came close to winning the race in 1995, holding a significant lead in the closing stages, but his engine failed nine laps from the finish.

Career

Early career
Growing up in south-west Sydney, Seton had a successful karting career before switching to cars after a heavy crash at Oran Park Raceway aged 17. He then raced for his father Barry's team in 1983, driving a Ford Capri and making his Bathurst 1000 debut in 1983 with Barry, better known as Bo. Seton then competed in three rounds of the 1984 Australian Touring Car Championship in the car.

Nissan Motorsport

He then moved to Nissan Motorsport from the 1984 Australian Endurance Championship and would remain with the team until the end of 1988. Father Barry also joined the team as engine builder. Glenn would first drive in a Nissan Pulsar EXA in the 1984 Castrol 500 at Sandown in Melbourne, and then at the 1984 James Hardie 1000, both times alongside Christine Gibson, the wife of his future boss Fred Gibson. In 1986, he would win his first major race, the Sandown 500 driving with George Fury.

His best individual year with Nissan came in 1987 driving the Nissan Skyline RS DR30 when he would finish second behind Jim Richards in the ATCC, only losing the championship after falling behind Richards in the final race at Oran Park Raceway. Teamed with John Bowe, Seton would then finish second in the 1987 James Hardie 1000 which that year was part of the inaugural World Touring Car Championship. Seton, who had driven a memorable stint on slick tyres in wet conditions, and Bowe were in a strong position behind the later-disqualified Eggenberger Motorsport Ford Sierra RS500s until a safety car delayed them. Post-season, Seton also competed at Suzuka Circuit in the final round of the 1987 Japanese Touring Car Championship with Anders Olofsson, finishing in fourth place. It was Seton's only major race outside Australasia.

1988 would be a frustrating year for Seton. Nissan introduced the new Skyline HR31 GTS-R, and with the car arriving only mid-season, the team could not get on terms with the much more powerful Ford Sierras. The cars initial unreliability saw Seton's Skyline retire from the first lap at both the Sandown 500 and Tooheys 1000, both times when the cars production-based gearbox failed.

Glenn Seton Racing

Following this, Seton and his father Bo left the Nissan team at the end of 1988 to set up Glenn Seton Racing, which ran from 1989 to 2002, initially with Ford Sierra RS500s. The team wrote off its only car in the team's third round at Lakeside International Raceway in 1989, forcing the team to miss the next two rounds. In this Group A Sierra period, in which Seton retained the Peter Jackson title sponsorship from the Nissan days, Seton would only win one championship round, at Symmons Plains Raceway in 1992. In addition to this, Seton reunited with George Fury to win the 1990 Sandown 500 which contributed to winning the 1990 Australian Endurance Championship.

Approaching the new Group 3A regulations developed for 1993, GSR was one of the teams to develop a new V8 engine Ford Falcon (EB). The team ran the Falcons at the season-ending endurance races in 1992, where Seton became the first driver to put a Falcon into the top 10 qualifiers at Bathurst since 1984. The move to the new V8 formula would prove fruitful for Seton, winning the 1993 and 1997 Australian Touring Car Championships. In this period from 1993 to 1997, Seton finished in the top three of the championship in each year. This was despite the team's level of funding and resources dropping significantly from 1996 following the end of tobacco sponsorship in Australia.

Despite his consistent success in the championship, success at Bathurst would continue to elude Seton in this period. Seton did claim pole position at Bathurst in 1994 and 1996, however was regularly hampered by reliability issues on race day. Most infamously, Seton was leading the 1995 Bathurst 1000 until the final ten laps when an engine failure caused him to retire from the race. The race held extra importance for Seton as it was thirty years after father Bo's Bathurst victory, Seton himself was 30 years of age and was running in car number 30. A promotional offer would have given Seton the choice between $30,000 or his father's Bathurst winning car should he have won the race.

Between 1999 and 2001, the team received increased funding from Ford Australia and was rebranded as Ford Tickford Racing. The team ran two cars in this period, first for Neil Crompton and then for Steven Richards but had limited success on track. Seton won his final solo championship race at Winton Motor Raceway in 2000, only losing the overall round victory after slipping off the track on oil in the final race. Seton missed the Sandown round in 2000 after a testing crash at Phillip Island, however still finished fifth in the championship, before dropping to 16th in 2001. The team downsized to one car in 2002 and lost the Tickford association, running with Ford Credit title sponsorship, who had backed Seton since 1996.

Ford Performance Racing
At the end of 2002, Seton sold the team to Prodrive and the team name was renamed to Ford Performance Racing with Seton remaining with the team as a driver. The team would run three cars in 2003 with Craig Lowndes and David Besnard joining the team, with Lowndes and Seton combining for a second-place finish at the 2003 Bathurst 1000. With Seton only being promoted to the 1987 podium after the later disqualifications, this was Seton's first time appearing on the Bathurst podium. In 2004, the team suffered a spate of engine failures and Seton would only finish 15th in the championship, five spots ahead of Lowndees. Despite this, Seton and Lowndes would repeat their 2003 runner-up finish at the 2004 Bathurst 1000, in what were Seton's only two podiums in his two-year stint with the team.

Dick Johnson Racing

In 2005 he moved to Dick Johnson Racing a team with whom Seton had a long rivalry with through the 1990s. In late 2005 after a disappointing season, Seton was sacked from Dick Johnson Racing halfway through his two-year contract and replaced by Will Davison for 2006.

Endurance co-driver

Seton was not able to find a 2006 full-time drive, so he joined Stone Brothers Racing for the two V8 Supercar endurance races with James Courtney. Brake issues hampered the #4 SBR Falcon at Sandown where it finished ninth. At Bathurst they finished third, Seton's third podium in four years at the event.

Seton moved from Ford and joined his childhood friend, and old Nissan teammate, Mark Skaife's Holden Racing Team squad in the 2007 and 2008 endurance races. This marked the first times in Seton's career to drive a Holden. He finished 13th in the Sandown 500 with Tony Longhurst and 11th in the Bathurst 1000 with Nathan Pretty. Seton again joined the Holden Racing Team in 2008, driving the #2 car with Craig Baird. The pair came 14th at the Phillip Island 500 and were running strongly at the Bathurst 1000 until a late race clash with Warren Luff put them out of the race. He made his final Bathurst appearance with Jason Bargwanna for Kelly Racing in 2010.

Later career
After retiring from full-time driving, Seton completed in multiple seasons of Touring Car Masters, including finally winning his first race victory at Bathurst in 2011. Seton would also finish 2nd in class at the 2017 Liqui Moly Bathurst 12 Hour driving with son Aaron.

Seton is currently involved in the Australian Speedway scene and has travelled to the US with 2007/08 and 2009/10 Australian Super Sedan Champion, Jamie McHugh

In 2013 Seton won the 2013 Great Southern 4 Hour, sharing a Mitsubishi Lancer Evo 10 with Bob Pearson.

Personal life

Seton, with ex-wife Jayne, is father of Courtney and Aaron Seton, the latter of whom has also embarked on a racing career and now works as a mechanic for Dick Johnson Racing. Seton grew up in Moorebank in south-west Sydney before moving to Melbourne to work on the Nissan programme with his father. Seton would later move to the Gold Coast in 2004 where he currently resides.

Career results

Supercars Championship results
(Races in bold indicate pole position) (Races in italics indicate fastest lap)

Complete World Touring Car Championship results
(key) (Races in bold indicate pole position) (Races in italics indicate fastest lap)

† Not eligible for series points

Complete Asia-Pacific Touring Car Championship results
(key) (Races in bold indicate pole position) (Races in italics indicate fastest lap)

Complete Bathurst 1000 results

Complete Sandown 500 results

References

External links 
 Seton joining Holden
 Bathurst stats

1965 births
Australian Touring Car Championship drivers
Living people
Supercars Championship drivers
Australian Formula 2 drivers
Racing drivers from Sydney
Australian Endurance Championship drivers
Kelly Racing drivers
Dick Johnson Racing drivers
Stone Brothers Racing drivers